The Russia national American football team is the official American football senior national team of Russia. The team was formed in 1992 alongside the Russian League of American Football.

History

The birth of American football in the USSR
American football first appeared in the USSR in the summer of 1989, when two Oklahoma high school football teams ("Stars" and "Boomers") played three exhibition games in Moscow, Leningrad, and Tallinn, Estonia. In 1989, the Moscow Bears team was formed and represented the Soviet Union in the international tournament. The first official game of the USSR national team took place against the German national team on 17 September 1989. The Bears lost 77–6. 

On 10 November 1989, the Union of American football in USSR was formed, but in 1990, due to differences in the leadership, the Union established an independent association. In 1991, all teams joined the association. In late January 1991, the USSR national team debuted in the European Championships qualifying tournament in a game against the Netherlands, losing to the Orange 30–7.

Russia
Following the collapse of the USSR in 1991, the Association of American football transformed into the Eurasian League. Teams from the former Soviet republics entered there. In 1994, the first school of American football was opened. In 1996 the Moscow Federation of American Football was created.

In 1998, the Russian national team debuted in the European Junior Championships in Düsseldorf, Germany. Russia took 4th place. In 2000, Russia was the runner-up of Europe, losing in the finals to the Germans. In 2002, they won the gold medal. In 1999, Russia debuted in the European League Cup. The Moscow Bears reached the quarterfinals, second to the Helsinki Roosters. In 2003, the adult team won the European Championship in group "C" and was promoted to group "B". In 2004, the team took third place in the European Championship in the "B" group. In 2012, they did not appear. Due to the long absence, the team moved to group "C".

In response to the 2022 Russian invasion of Ukraine, the European champion Italy national American football team announced that it refused to play against Russia in October 2022 in a qualifier for the 2023 IFAF European Championships.

References

Russia
American football in Russia
American Football
1992 establishments in Russia
American football teams established in 1992